Zoran Galović (born 14 September 1967) is a Yugoslav wrestler. He competed at the 1988 Summer Olympics and the 1992 Summer Olympics.

References

1967 births
Living people
Yugoslav male sport wrestlers
Olympic wrestlers of Yugoslavia
Olympic wrestlers as Independent Olympic Participants
Wrestlers at the 1988 Summer Olympics
Wrestlers at the 1992 Summer Olympics
Place of birth missing (living people)